Votanikos is a neighborhood located 3 km west of the downtown part of the Greek capital of Athens.  The area is named after a nearby botanical garden situated to the southwest (Athens Botanical Gardens).  The eastern part are residential, the western part are forested and industrialized.  The subdivision has no squares but has a nearby school. Major streets bordering this subdivision includes Patsi Street to the west, Athinon Avenue to the north, Konstantinopouleos Avenue and the rail to the south and Petrou Ralli Avenue to the south.  The Iera Odos runs in the middle. The population is around 5,000–6,000 people and the area is about 0.5 km². Athens's first mosque will be in Votanikos district.

Neighboring quarters

Akadimia Platonos, north
Profitis Daniil, northeast
Asyrmatos, south
Kato Petralona, south

History

The area saw housing developments in the early part of the 20th century when Athens' began to grow as well as an industrial being added, the area after World War II and the Greek Civil War saw taller buildings to be added.

Panathinaikos Stadium

The area will be home to largest football specific football stadium in Greece which will have a capacity of 40,000 seats. The 
 Votanikos Stadium will be surrounded by a large park and other Panathinaikos facilities.

Athens Mosque
Athens' first purpose-built mosque in modern times is being built in Votanikos on a disused navy base under the direct order of former left wing primeminister Alexis Tsipras. The mosque is 1,000 square meters (3,300 square feet) with enough space for 500 worshipers.

Residential streets

Here is a list of residential streets, several of which are named after places in Northern Greece as well as Pelagonia and Falaisias. Neighborhood streets runs from NNW to SSE and from SSW to NNE. This list excludes major streets which are mentioned on the top. There are 287 streets and avenues as well as one connector in this subdivision.

References

Neighbourhoods in Athens